Defending champion Sam Schröder defeated Niels Vink in the final, 6–2, 7–5 to win the quad singles wheelchair tennis title at the 2023 Australian Open.

Seeds

Draw

Finals

References

External links 
 Draw

Wheelchair Quad Singles
Australian Open, 2023 Quad Singles